The  (referred to in the film as  ねこのバス, Neko no basu) is a fictional character in the Studio Ghibli film My Neighbor Totoro, directed by Hayao Miyazaki. It is a large, grinning, twelve-legged cat with a hollow body that serves as a bus, complete with windows and seats covered with fur and a large bushy tail. The character's popularity has led to its use in a spinoff film, toys for children, an art car, and a place in the Ghibli Museum. Catbus is believed to be based on the Japanese bakeneko (化け猫, “changed cat”), an ancient urban legend where cats that grow old learn to shape-shift. In the original Japanese film My Neighbor Totoro, Catbus is voiced by Naoki Tatsuta. In the Disney English release, Catbus is voiced by Frank Welker.

Character description 

In My Neighbor Totoro, the Catbus is depicted as a large, twelve-legged creature with a cat's head, a furry bus-like body and a large tail. Its eyes function as headlights, and its body features rectangular openings that serve as windows. The film shows the Catbus changing its shape to form doors for passengers to board. It is hollow and has chairs with fur around the interior walls. Its orange fur is shown to have brown stripes running around its back, forehead, legs, sides, and tail. There is a destination sign on the front of its rear that shifts to match its destination. Mice with glowing eyes are taped next to its destination sign to serve as tail lights. It has a large smile at all times, and can appear and disappear at will. It can travel to any destination that its passengers desire.

The fictional character catbus was inspired by the Cheshire Cat from the 1951 Disney film Alice in Wonderland. The Cheshire Cat and Catbus share their large, mischievous grins.

Media 

The Catbus was featured in the short 13-minute film Mei and the Kittenbus, which is shown only in the Ghibli Museum. In the film Mei, the younger sister, meets the offspring of the original Catbus, which is simply named Kittenbus. It is just large enough to fit Mei inside, and can only stir up dust devils. They fly into the forest with many other cat-based vehicles, including different types of catbuses and cattrains, which carry Totoro and many other forest spirits to a catliner, which is depicted as an ancient cat. Mei meets O-Totoro and befriends the catliner, before returning in the kittenbus to her home.
The Catbus, along with many of Miyazaki's characters, was parodied on the "Married to the Blob" episode of The Simpsons.
One of the art cars at Burning Man was a Catbus.
 In the video game Persona 5, Morgana has the ability to turn himself into a bus. He explains that the Japanese public has a widespread cognition of cats transforming into buses "for some reason", as a reference to Catbus, which is the reason he can do this in the Metaverse.
An unofficial gravity racer version of the Catbus featured in the London 2019 edition of the Red Bull Soapbox Race. The 'Team Totoro' vehicle negotiated jumps and other obstacles at speeds in excess of 30 mph to complete the Alexandra Palace course.
A car resembling Catbus briefly appears in the Cars Toons short "Tokyo Mater".
Catbus was used as a design base for the six-legged sky bison Appa on Avatar: The Last Airbender.

Merchandise 
The Catbus has been produced as a popular plush toy and as a con-vehicle.
Many chain fashion stores, like Hot Topic, sell merchandise with designs of Catbus and other well-known characters from Studio Ghibli films.

Other references 
A species of velvet worm Eoperipatus totoro described in June 2013 was named by the scientists because of its somewhat resemblance to the Totoro Catbus.
In the Ghibli Museum in Mitaka, Japan, there is an exhibit of a large plush catbus, which can be played with and entered by children 12 years and under.
The Catbus has been referenced by Anthrocon staff when mentioning its hotel shuttle service from remote hotels in Pittsburgh.  Commenters have suggested that in this instance, "CATbus" would be for "Circulating Anthropomorphic Transit bus".

See also 
 List of fictional cats
 Appa, the flying bison companion of Aang in Avatar: The Last Airbender

References

Further reading

External links
 My Neighbor Totoro at Nausicaa.net
 Mei and the Kittenbus at Nausicaa.net
 Gallery of Bake Neko art
 Ghibli museum about Catbus exhibit

Fantasy anime and manga characters
Fictional cats
Film characters introduced in 1988
Fictional vehicles
Works by Hayao Miyazaki
Studio Ghibli